Falkner Glacier, is an east-flowing valley glacier,  long, located  south of Oakley Glacier in the Mountaineer Range, Victoria Land, Antarctica. The glacier descends steeply to Lady Newnes Bay where it forms a floating glacier tongue. It was named by the Advisory Committee on Antarctic Names (2008) after Kelly K. Falkner, Professor of Chemical Oceanography at Oregon State University, who served from 2006 as the first Program Director for the Antarctic Integrated System Science Program in the Division of Antarctic Sciences, Office of Antarctic Programs, National Science Foundation.

See also
 List of glaciers in the Antarctic
 List of Antarctic ice streams
 Glaciology

References

External links
 Antarctic glacier named after Oregon scientist

Glaciers of Borchgrevink Coast